The 2006 Australian Formula Ford Championship was a CAMS sanctioned motor racing title for drivers of Formula Ford racing cars. It was the 37th national series for Formula Fords to be held in Australia and the 14th to carry the Australian Formula Ford Championship name. The 1600cc Ford “Duratec” engine as used in the Ford Fiesta was introduced for the 2006 championship, replacing the Ford “Kent” engine that had been mandatory for Formula Ford in Australia for over 30 years.

Calendar
The title was contested over an eight-round series with three races per round.
 Round 1, Adelaide Parklands Circuit, South Australia, 23–26 March
 Round 2, Barbagallo Raceway, Wanneroo, Western Australia, 12–14 May
 Round 3, Queensland Raceway, Ipswich, Queensland, 21–23 July
 Round 4, Oran Park Motorsport Circuit, New South Wales, 11–13 August
 Round 5, Sandown International Motor Raceway, Victoria, 1–3 September
 Round 6, Mallala Motor Sport Park, South Australia, 15–17 September
 Round 7, Symmons Plains International Raceway, Tasmania, 10–12 November
 Round 8, Phillip Island Grand Prix Circuit, Victoria, 8–10 December

Points system
Championship points were awarded on a 20-16-14-12-10-8-6-4-2-1 basis to the top ten classified finishers in each race. An additional point was awarded to the driver gaining pole position for each round.

Drivers' championship standings

References

External links
 Technical Regulations for Formula Ford in Australia – 2006  Retrieved from web.archive.org on 3 November 2009
 Thumbnail images from the 2006 AFFC Retrieved from web.archive.org on 3 November 2009
 Formula Ford Australia – official website Retrieved from www.formulaford.com.au on 3 November 2009

Australian Formula Ford Championship seasons
Formula Ford Championship